"Set the Night to Music" is a song written by Diane Warren and recorded by Starship on their LP, No Protection (1987).  It became a major hit for Roberta Flack in 1991. Starship's original version became a Top 10 hit on the U.S. Billboard Adult Contemporary chart, reaching number nine in the spring of 1988, and also charted minorly in Canada. The song appeared at the end credits of the 1988 fantasy-comedy film Vice Versa starring Judge Reinhold and Fred Savage.

Cash Box said of the Starship version that "punctuated by lush strings an^acoustic guitars, it's as warm and a^^^pealing a ballad as they have ever put on record."

Roberta Flack cover
Roberta Flack covered "Set the Night to Music" as a duet with Maxi Priest. The song is the title track of Flack's album Set the Night to Music (1991). 

Flack's rendition reached number six on the U.S. Billboard Hot 100 and number nine in Canada.  The song was a bigger Adult Contemporary hit, reaching number two in the U.S. and number one in Canada.

Personnel 
 Roberta Flack – lead vocals
 Robbie Kondor – keyboards, programming, arrangements
 Sammy Merendino – drum programming
 Errol "Crusher" Bennett – percussion
 Arif Mardin – string arrangements and conductor
 Gene Orloff – concertmaster
 Jerry Barnes – backing vocals
 Katreese Barnes – backing vocals
 Maxi Priest – lead vocals

Chart history

Weekly charts
Starship

Roberta Flack

Year-end charts

References

External links
  (Roberta Flack)
  (Jefferson Starship)

1987 songs
1991 singles
Roberta Flack songs
Starship (band) songs
Atlantic Records singles
Songs written by Diane Warren
Song recordings produced by Arif Mardin
Song recordings produced by Peter Wolf (producer)
Maxi Priest songs
1988 singles
RCA Records singles